Diana Magnay is a British journalist who is currently Sky News' Moscow correspondent.

She was educated at Wycombe Abbey, and holds a BA in Modern History from St Hugh's College, Oxford where she received the Arnold Modern History Prize in 1999, and a masters in War Studies at King's College London where she won the Director's Prize for International Peace and Security. She previously reported for CNN for more than a decade and worked freelance for Channel 4 News. In 2014 CNN moved her out of the Middle East after she referred to a group of Israelis who had allegedly threatened her in Sderot while she was reporting on Gaza as "scum" on twitter; she was subsequently reassigned to Moscow. She joined Sky News in January 2018.

References

Year of birth missing (living people)
Living people
People educated at Wycombe Abbey
Alumni of St Hugh's College, Oxford
Alumni of King's College London
Sky News newsreaders and journalists